Parijan (also Romanized as Parījān; also known as Barīḥān, Barījān, Bī Rīḩān, and Borīhān) is a village in Dodangeh Rural District, Hurand District, Ahar County, East Azerbaijan Province, Iran. At the 2006 census, its population was 137, in 29 families.

References 

Populated places in Ahar County